Listed below are the UCI Women's Teams that competed in road bicycle racing events organized by the International Cycling Union (UCI), including the UCI Women's Road World Cup in 2012.

Teams overview
The ranking in the table below is decided by the points accumulated by each team's best four riders in the previous season. The organisers of Women's World Cup events are obliged to invite the top 15 teams, and the organisers of Women's UCI class 1 events must invite the top 10 teams.

The country designation of each team is determined by the country of registration of the largest number of its riders, and is not necessarily the country where the team is registered or based.

Riders

AA Drink–leontien.nl Cycling Team

The 2012 women's road racing team included six riders who were formerly members of the disbanded Garmin–Cervélo women's team: British cyclists Emma Pooley, Lizzie Armitstead, Sharon Laws and Lucy Martin, Belgian Jessie Daams and Australian Carla Ryan.
Ages as of 1 January 2012.

ABUS–Nutrixxion

Ages as of 1 January 2012.

Alriksson–Go:Green

Ages as of 1 January 2012.

ASPTT Dijon–Bourgogne

Ages as of 1 January 2012.

Axman Team Taiwan

Ages as of 1 January 2012.

Be Pink

Ages as of 1 January 2012.

Bizkaia–Durango

Ages as of 1 January 2012.

China Chongming–Giant Pro Cycling
Ages as of 1 January 2012.

Debabarrena–Gipuzkoa

Ages as of 1 January 2012.

Diadora–Pasta Zara

Ages as of 1 January 2012.

Dolmans–Boels cyclingteam

Ages as of 1 January 2012.

Exergy TWENTY12

Ages as of 1 January 2012.

Faren Honda Team

Ages as of 1 January 2012.

Fassa Bortolo–Servetto

Ages as of 1 January 2012.

Forno d'Asolo Colavita

Ages as of 1 January 2012.

GreenEDGE–AIS
Ages as of 1 January 2012.

Hitec Products–Mistral Home Cycling Team

Ages as of 1 January 2012.

Kleo Ladies Team

Ages as of 1 January 2012.

Lointek

Ages as of 1 January 2012.

Lotto–Belisol Ladies

Ages as of 1 January 2012.

MCipollini–Giambenini

Ages as of 1 January 2012.

Rabobank Women Cycling Team

Ages as of 1 January 2012.

RusVelo

Ages as of 1 January 2012.

S.C. Michela Fanini Rox

Ages as of 1 January 2012.

Scappa Speed Queens

Ages as of 1 January 2012.

Sengers Ladies Cycling Team

Ages as of 1 January 2012.

Team Bizhub–FCF

Ages as of 1 January 2012.

Team GSD Gestion

Ages as of 1 January 2012.

Team Ibis Cycles

Ages as of 1 January 2012.

Team Skil–Argos

Ages as of 1 January 2012.

Team Specialized–lululemon

Ages as of 1 January 2012. 

Source

TIBCO–To The Top
Ages as of 1 January 2012.

Topsport Vlaanderen–Ridley
Ages as of 1 January 2012.

Vaiano Tepso
Ages as of 1 January 2012.

Verinlegno–Fabiani

Ages as of 1 January 2012.

Vienne Futuroscope
Ages as of 1 January 2012.

References

2012 in women's road cycling
2012
 
2012 UCI Women's Road World Cup